Jüri Martin (born 29 September 1940 in Tallinn) is an Estonian lichenologist and politician. He was a member of IX Riigikogu.

References

Living people
1940 births
Estonian biologists
Estonian mycologists
Estonian Greens politicians
Estonian Centre Party politicians
Members of the Riigikogu, 1999–2003
University of Tartu alumni
Politicians from Tallinn